Robert Sebastian Andrzejuk (born 17 July 1975 in Wrocław, Dolnośląskie) is a Polish fencer who won a silver medal in Men's Team Épée (Fencing) at the 2008 Summer Olympics in Beijing, together with Tomasz Motyka, Adam Wiercioch, and Radosław Zawrotniak.

For his sport achievements, he received: 
 Golden Cross of Merit in 2008.

In 2007, he married a fencer and later minister Danuta Dmowska.

References 
 Robert Andrzejuk in ''Pekin.onet.pl
 sports-reference

1975 births
Living people
Polish male fencers
Fencers at the 2008 Summer Olympics
Olympic fencers of Poland
Olympic silver medalists for Poland
Sportspeople from Wrocław
Medalists at the 2008 Summer Olympics
Olympic medalists in fencing